Gross out is described as a movement in art (often with comical connotations), which is intended to shock the viewer(s) and disgust the wider audience by presenting them with  controversial material (such as toilet humor and fetishes) that might be ill received by a mainstream audience. The content of the movement is not for the average art appreciatist.

Cinema

Features
Gross-out is a subgenre of comedy movies in which the makers employ humor that is willfully "tasteless"  or even downright disgusting. It usually involves gratuitous nudity, unrealistic aggressiveness towards property or Schadenfreude. The movies are generally aimed at a younger audience aged between 18 and 24. One boon of this genre is that it provides an inexpensive way to make a movie "edgy" and to generate media attention for it.

History
In the United States, following the abolition of the film industry's censorious Production Code and its replacement with the MPAA film rating system in the late 1960s, some filmmakers began to experiment with subversive film comedies, which explicitly dealt with taboo subjects such as sex and other bodily functions.  Noteworthy examples include 1972's Pink Flamingos (in which the central character eats dog excrement) and other films by John Waters, and 1974's sketch comedy film The Groove Tube. As these films emerged from the counterculture movement and gained a measure of audience success, they inspired more mainstream films to follow their example. However, long before the Production Code, early silent comedy film makers produced and attempted several 'gross-out' pictures to the disdain of early film reviewers. One such example is the lost Nell's Eugenic Wedding starring Fay Tincher and Tod Browning.

The label "gross-out movie" was first applied by the mainstream media to 1978's National Lampoon's Animal House, a comedy about the fraternity experience at US colleges. Its humor included explicit use of bodily functions (like projectile vomiting).  It was a great box office success despite its limited production costs and thus started an industry trend. Since then, gross-out films increased in number, and became almost the norm for American comedy films. Some films of this genre could be aimed at teen audiences (such as Superbad, Porky's, American Pie or Eurotrip), while others are targeted at somewhat more mature audiences (such as Borat, The Hangover or Wedding Crashers).

Theatre 

Gross-out theatre is practiced on stage, particularly in the Edinburgh Festival. However, it is also displayed in British theatres.

The prime examples of the above are the stage version of the contemporary drama Trainspotting by bestselling playwright and author Irvine Welsh; the controversial New York musical Urinetown by Kotis and Hollmann; the outrageous anarchistic schlockomedy (shock horror comedy) musical about a Manchester jobcentre Restart by Komedy Kollective; and performances by another United Kingdom-based act, Forced Entertainment, who devised the iconic theatrical gorefest Bloody Mess.

Art 

American cartoonist Basil Wolverton invented his trademark "spaghetti and meatballs" style of artwork.

Various artists helped create a flourishing gross-out art scene, which began mainly in the 1990s, the most famous of which were Damien Hirst, known for encasing mutilated, rotting cattle in formaldehyde, and making art of endangered marine species such as sharks in formaldehyde tanks, and Tracey Emin, whose exhibit of an unmade bed featured used tampons, condoms and blood-stained underwear.

Music 

Gross out themes are common in popular music genres, such as hip hop and hard rock, where shock value helps create notoriety.  Bands include Blink-182, Cannibal Corpse and Agoraphobic Nosebleed.

GG Allin Allin was infamous for his transgressive music act, which included eating excrement, mutilating himself and attacking audience members.

Similar themes are also sometimes conveyed in music videos, such as Gross Out, a single from indie/garage rock band, The Vines.

See also
 Garbage Pail Kids
 Off-color humor
 Screwball comedy film
 Teen movie

References

External links 

Visual arts genres
Comedy
Film genres
Theatrical genres
Censorship